Barbara Moore may refer to:
 Barbara Moore (ambassador) (1952–2010), United States ambassador to Nicaragua
 Barbara Moore (athlete) (born 1957), New Zealand long-distance runner
 Barbara Moore (composer) (1932–2021), British composer, arranger and vocalist for film, television and commercials
 Barbara Moore (model) (born 1968), Playboy magazine's Playmate for December 1992
 Barbara Moore (vegetarian) (1903–1977), Russian-born health enthusiast and long-distance walker
 Barbara Mbitjana Moore (born 1964), Australian artist